Thomas Hollingsworth (1748-1814) was a British stage actor.

Born to a house servant at Covent Garden, following the death of his father he was mentored by the actor Joseph Younger. Hollingsworth first acted at Covent Garden and later joined Richard Brinsley Sheridan's company at Drury Lane appearing in numerous roles between 1787 and 1804. He was also acted in various provincial theatres.

Selected roles
 Taffy in The Welsh Heiress by Edward Jerningham (1795)
 Mr Quake in Knave or Not? by Thomas Holcroft (1798)
 Squeez'em in The East Indian by Matthew Lewis (1799)
 Robert in Hear Both Sides by Thomas Holcroft (1803)

References

Bibliography
 Cox, Jeffrey N. & Gamer, Michael. The Broadview Anthology of Romantic Drama. Broadview Press, 2003.

18th-century English people
English male stage actors
British male stage actors
18th-century English male actors
18th-century British male actors
19th-century English male actors
19th-century British male actors
Male actors from London
1748 births
1814 deaths